Kálvin tér is a transfer station on the M3 and the M4 lines of the Budapest Metro. It is located beneath the eponymous square, named after John Calvin. The Line 3 station was opened on 31 December 1976 as part of the inaugural section of Line M3 between Deák Ferenc tér and Nagyvárad tér. The Line M4 station was opened on 28 March 2014 as part of the inaugural section of the line, from Keleti pályaudvar to Kelenföld vasútállomás.

Connections
Bus: 9, 15, 100E, 115
Trolleybus: 72M, 83M
Tram: 47, 48, 49

References
Budapest City Atlas, Szarvas-Dimap, Budapest, 2011, 
Official web page of the Line 4 construction

M3 (Budapest Metro) stations
M4 (Budapest Metro) stations
Railway stations opened in 1976
1976 establishments in Hungary